Jan Nesvadba (born 4 August 1991) is a Czech cyclo-cross cyclist.

Major results

Cyclo-cross

2007–08
 1st  Junior National Cyclo-cross Championships
2016–17
 2nd Overall Toi Toi Cup
1st Kolín
 3rd National Cyclo-cross Championships
2017–18
 2nd National Cyclo-cross Championships
2018–19
 Toi Toi Cup
1st Hlinsko
1st Jičín

Mountain bike

2013
 3rd Mixed relay, European Mountain Bike Championships
2014
 World University Mountain Bike Championshipd
2nd Time trial
3rd Cross-country

References

External links
 

1991 births
Living people
Czech male cyclists
Cyclo-cross cyclists
Cross-country mountain bikers
People from Semily District
Sportspeople from the Liberec Region